The Poison Rose (released internationally as Eye for an Eye) is a 2019 American thriller film starring John Travolta and Morgan Freeman. The film was directed by George Gallo and Francesco Cinquemani. It was written by Richard Salvatore, Francesco Cinquemani, and Luca Giliberto, based on Salvatore's novel of the same title.
The film was released on May 24, 2019 by Lionsgate, and was panned by critics and audiences. The film was also a commercial failure, grossing only $323,754.

The film received the best directing international award at the Terre di Siena Film Festival.

Plot

Set in 1978, the plot centers on Los Angeles private investigator Carson Phillips. He is hired to conduct an investigation in his Texas hometown where mental facility patient Barbara Van Poole has been incommunicado for some time, which has her L.A.-based niece worried about her well-being.

Upon reaching the sanatorium,  he notices that the staff all look nervous when he asks for her. Dr. Miles, the head doctor, is evasive and strings him along for several days. Carson never gets to see Mrs Van Poole.

He meets up with his ex, Jayne, and her daughter, Becky. Becky is married to the star quarterback, Happy. One night during a game, Happy suddenly dies and the police strongly suspect Becky. Jayne asks Carson for help.

Becky was being abused by Happy, but since he was the star quarterback, the police would not arrest him. It is later learned Dr. Miles was killing off patients who were not financially supported by their families, Barbara Van Poole included, and collecting their social security money. Carson uncovers the truth and Dr. Miles is shot dead by a patient. Carson learns he is Becky’s father. 

Carson and Jayne reconcile and he finds a bottle of cancer pills. This same substance was found in Happy's blood. He accuses her of "doing anything to protect her daughter" and realizes that she was the one who poisoned Happy. Becky comes out and asks her if she did it. At first Jayne denies everything, but then admits that she thought that Happy would kill Becky and since she herself did not have long to live, no one would be left to protect her daughter. Becky forgives her.

The movie ends with Carson stating that he was going to go home, then realizes he is home, implying he stays with his ex and daughter instead of going back to Los Angeles.

Cast

Production
Forest Whitaker was previously in talks to portray Dr. Mitchell before Brendan Fraser assumed the role.

Principal photography took place in Savannah, Georgia, in June 2018 and continued in Italy after the summer.

Release
The film was released on May 24, 2019 by Lionsgate.  The film was dedicated in memory of Steve and Geraldine Salvatore, the parents of Richard Salvatore, who wrote the novel, The Poison Rose.

Reception
On Metacritic, the film has a weighted average score of 30 out of 100, based on four critics, indicating "generally unfavorable reviews". The Guardian described it as a "ridiculous and mostly boring hardboiled thriller".

References

External links
 
 

2019 films
American crime thriller films
Films based on American novels
Films directed by George Gallo
Films shot in Georgia (U.S. state)
Lionsgate films
2010s English-language films
2010s American films